Dimitri Pelo (born 17 April 1985) is a French former professional rugby league footballer who last played for the Canberra Raiders in the NRL. He has previously played for Montpellier Herault RC after switching codes in 2010 and for the Catalans Dragons club of the Super League.

Career
Pelo was born in Nouméa, New Caledonia, an overseas territory of France. He emigrated to Australia with his parents while still in his adolescence, originally settling in the north-eastern state of Queensland. While living there, Pelo began playing junior rugby league, catching the eye of Cronulla-Sutherland Sharks scouts who signed him to the Sydney club for several years.

While at Cronulla-Sutherland, Pelo went on to represent the Australian Schoolboys team for whom he scored two tries in a Test match defeat against the England Academy in 2002, but he could not make his way into the Cronulla first-grade side, instead being relegated to the reserves and lower competitions.

During the 2005 season, Pelo was called up by French national team along with fellow clubman Daniel Dumas; during this time his contract with the Cronulla club expired and he left the club. Pelo then moved back to Queensland, originally signing a short-term deal with the Burleigh Bears club in the Queensland Cup in the hope of securing a longer-term deal with the Gold Coast Titans in the National Rugby League (NRL).

During the end of the 2006 season, the Gold Coast club displayed interest in Pelo, selecting him in several early trial matches and a sevens competition but ultimately he was unsuccessful in securing any deal with the club so began to look abroad. For the beginning of the 2007 season Pelo signed a deal with the French club Catalans Dragons.

He was named in the France training squad for the 2008 Rugby League World Cup.

He was named in the France squad for the 2008 Rugby League World Cup.

He switched codes for the 2010/11 season, playing for Montpellier Hérault RC.

In December 2011 he trialled with the Canberra Raiders with the hope of gaining a first-grade contract after the departure of Daniel Vidot to the St. George Illawarra Dragons.
His trial successfully earned him a one-year contract with the Canberra club. He made his debut in the Round 12 36–18 defeat against South Sydney on 12 May 2012.

Career highlights
 1999-2001: Played for Queensland Juniors
 2001: Signed with the Bull Dogs
 2002: Represented Australian School Boys
 2002–2004: Played for Burleigh  Bears – Queensland Cup
 2003: Represented France – Mediterranean Cup - 4 appearances, 1 try
 2004–2006: Played for reserves Cronulla Sharks
 2005: Represented France – Rugby Sevens Cup - 4 appearances, 2 tries
 2006: Played for Burleigh  Bears (Gold Coast Titans Reserves)
 2007–2010: Played for Catalans Dragons (Super League)
 2007 – 12 appearances, 5 tries
 2008- 20 appearances, 10 tries
 2009 -24 appearances, 17 tries
 2010- 17 appearances, 4 tries
 2008-  (play offs) 2 tries
 2009 – (play-offs) 3 tries
 2008- Carnegie challenge cup – 4 appearances, 1 try
 2009- carnegie challenge cup – 5 appearances, 2 tries
 2010- carnegie challenge cup -  6 appearances, 2 tries
 2008: Represented France – World Cup - 2 appearances
 2009: Represented France – 4 Nations - 2 appearances
 2010- 2011: Played for Montpellier MHR (top 14 rugby union) - 9 appearances, 5 tries
 Amlin challenge cup – 5 appearances, 2 tries
 2012: Played for Canberra Raiders (NRL) – 1 appearance

Career playing statistics

Point scoring summary

Point scoring summary

Matches played

Matches played

References

External links
 Dimitri Pelo Official profile (in French)
 Dimitri Pelo Super League profile
 Dimitri Pelo playing history
 Players to watch - Dimitri Pelo (France)

1985 births
Living people
Burleigh Bears players
Canberra Raiders players
Catalans Dragons players
Expatriate rugby league players in Australia
France national rugby league team players
French expatriate rugby league players
French expatriate sportspeople in Australia
French rugby league players
French rugby union players
Montpellier Hérault Rugby players
Mount Pritchard Mounties players
New Caledonian rugby league players
People from Nouméa
Rugby league fullbacks
Rugby league wingers
Rugby union players from Wallis and Futuna